Ceryx burgeffi is a moth of the subfamily Arctiinae. It was described by Obraztsov in 1949. It is found on Java.

References

Ceryx (moth)
Moths described in 1949